WJO may refer to:

 Widespread Depression Jazz Orchestra
 Wiener Jeunesse Orchester